The 1982 Ms. Olympia contest was an IFBB professional bodybuilding competition was held in 1982 in Atlantic City, New Jersey.  It was the 3rd Ms. Olympia competition held.

Results

See also
 1982 Mr. Olympia

References

 1982 Ms Olympia Results

External links
 Competitor History of the Ms. Olympia

Ms Olympia, 1982
Ms. Olympia

Ms. Olympia
History of female bodybuilding

es:Ms. Olympia
it:Ms. Olympia
he:גברת אולימפיה
nl:Ms. Olympia
pl:Ms. Olympia
pt:Ms. Olympia
sv:Ms. Olympia